Beckenham is a constituency represented in the House of Commons of the Parliament of the United Kingdom since 2010 by Bob Stewart, a Conservative.

Constituency profile
The constituency is mostly leafy and suburban — one widely known gazetteer summarised this in 2012:  There are significant areas of open land to the south around Hayes and Keston. The upmarket town centre of Beckenham is split between this constituency and Lewisham West and Penge to the west.

All wards have voted between 60 and 70% Conservative since the seat's inception. In times when Labour has led in the national polls the seat has remained Conservative. The smallest majority in a general election was 9.3%, in 1997; in all other elections except 2001 there have been majorities of more than 15%. The seat happened to become safer in its cut down to six wards (from ten) in 2010. This removed the three most Labour inclined wards of the borough, centered on Penge, and one other, taken from the more suburban parts that lean strongly or weakly Conservative.

Since 1983 there has been a close contest for second place between Labour and the Liberal Democrats. Labour's share has remained much greater than in Orpington whereas the Liberal Democrat share has remained much greater than in Croydon Central.

History

The constituency has only elected Conservatives as its MPs since 1950.

The closest the Conservatives have ever come to losing this seat was at a by-election in November 1997, at the height of Tony Blair's 'honeymoon period' as Prime Minister, following the resignation of the previous MP Piers Merchant in a sex scandal. Even then, the former MP for Hastings who lost her seat in the earlier 1997 general election, Jacqui Lait, managed to win the seat by just over 1,000 votes.

Between 1957 and 1992 the long-serving MP for Beckenham was Sir Philip Goodhart, who was soon after 1979 discovered by Margaret Thatcher to be a right-of-centre or 'wet conservative' and consequently his career as a junior minister came to a quick end.  Goodhart is best known for his book on the workings of the Conservative MPs' 1922 Committee, and for his brother Charles, who was a famous economics professor at LSE and sat for some time on the Bank of England's monetary policy committee.

Before Sir Philip Goodhart, the former Conservative Chief Whip Patrick Buchan-Hepburn represented Beckenham in Parliament.

Boundaries

1950–1974: The Municipal Borough of Beckenham, and the Urban District of Penge.

1974–1983: The London Borough of Bromley wards of Anerley, Clock House, Copers Cope, Eden Park, Lawrie Park and Kent House, Manor House, Penge, and Shortlands.

1983–1997: The London Borough of Bromley wards of Anerley, Clock House, Copers Cope, Eden Park, Kelsey Park, Lawrie Park and Kent House, Penge, and Shortlands.

1997–2010: The London Borough of Bromley wards of Anerley, Clock House, Copers Cope, Eden Park, Kelsey Park, Lawrie Park and Kent House, Penge, Shortlands, West Wickham North, and West Wickham South.

2010–present: The London Borough of Bromley wards of Bromley Common and Keston, Copers Cope, Hayes and Coney Hall, Kelsey and Eden Park, Shortlands, and West Wickham.

Note that - despite the changes in ward names - the 1974-1983 boundaries and the 1983-1997 boundaries listed above are almost exactly the same boundaries. Similarly - despite the changes in local authorities and the listing of wards - the 1950-1974 boundaries and the 1997-2010 boundaries listed are almost exactly the same boundaries.

Beckenham constituency covers the north-western part of the London Borough of Bromley. The local government ward boundaries were redrawn for the 2002 local elections, though this did not affect parliamentary limits until the 2010 general election.

Pre-2010 boundary review
Following their review of parliamentary representation in South London, the Boundary Commission for England made revisions to this seat. Clock House ward, Crystal Palace ward, and Penge and Cator ward were transferred from Beckenham to help create the new constituency of Lewisham West and Penge. Parts of Bromley Common and Keston, Hayes and Coney Hall, and Shortlands wards were transferred to Beckenham from Bromley and Chislehurst. A small part of Bromley Common and Keston ward was transferred to Beckenham from Orpington and a tiny part of Bromley Town ward was transferred from Beckenham to Bromley and Chislehurst.

Members of Parliament

Elections

Elections in the 2010s

Elections in the 2000s

Elections in the 1990s

Elections in the 1980s

Elections in the 1970s

Elections in the 1960s

Elections in the 1950s

See also
 List of parliamentary constituencies in London

Notes

References

External links 
Politics Resources (election results from 1922 onwards)
Electoral Calculus (election results from 1955 onwards)

Politics of the London Borough of Bromley
Parliamentary constituencies in London
Constituencies of the Parliament of the United Kingdom established in 1950